The Journal of Electrocardiology  is a peer-reviewed medical journal covering electrocardiography, vectorcardiography, Cardiac arrhythmias, membrane action potential, cardiac pacing, monitoring defibrillation, instrumentation, drug effects, and computer applications. It is the official journal of the International Society for Computerized Electrocardiology and the International Society of Electrocardiology.

Abstracting and indexing 
The journal is abstracted and indexed in:
 Current Contents/Clinical Medicine
 EMBASE
 Index Medicus/MEDLINE/PubMed
 Science Citation Index
 Scopus
According to the Journal Citation Reports, the journal has a 2013 impact factor of 1.363.

References

External links 
 

Cardiology journals
Bimonthly journals
English-language journals
Publications established in 1968
Elsevier academic journals